California's state elections were held November 2, 2004. Necessary primary elections were held on March 2. Up for election were all the seats of the State Assembly, 20 seats of the State Senate, and sixteen ballot measures.

California State Legislature elections

State Senate

There are 40 seats in the State Senate. For this election, candidates running in odd-numbered districts ran for four-year terms.

State Assembly

All 80 biennially elected seats of the State Assembly were up for election this year. Each seat has a two-year term. The Democrats retained control of the State Assembly.

Statewide ballot propositions
Sixteen ballot propositions qualified to be listed on the general election ballot in California. Nine of these measures were passed, whilst seven failed.

Proposition 1A
Proposition 1A would protect local funding and tax revenues for locally delivered services and prohibit the State from reducing local governments' property tax proceeds. Proposition 1A passed with 83.6% approval.

Proposition 59
Proposition 59 would amend the Constitution to provide the public the right to access meetings of government bodies and writings of government officials. Proposition 59 passed with 83.3% approval.

Proposition 60

Proposition 60 would provide the right for political parties participating in a primary election for partisan office to also participate in the general election for that office. Proposition 60 passed with 67.5% approval.

Proposition 60A

Proposition 60A would reserve proceeds from sale of surplus state property purchased with General Fund monies to payment of principal, interest on Economic Recovery Bonds approved in March 2004. Proposition 60A passed with 73.2% approval.

Proposition 61

Proposition 61 authorizes $750 million in bonds for grants for construction, expansion, remodeling, renovation, furnishing and equipping children's hospitals. Proposition 61 passed with 58.3% approval.

Proposition 62

Proposition 62 would allow voters to vote for any state or federal candidate, except for president, regardless of party registration of voter or candidate. Proposition 62 failed with 46.2% approval.

Proposition 63

Proposition 63 would establish a 1% tax on taxable personal income above $1 million to fund expanded health services for the mentally ill. Proposition 63 passed with 53.7% approval.

Proposition 64

Proposition 64 limits the ability for lawsuits to be filed, only allowing them if there was actual loss. Proposition 64 passed with 58.9% approval.

Proposition 65

Proposition 65 would amend the constitution to allow for voter approval of reductions of local fee or tax revenues. Proposition 65 failed with 37.6% approval.

Proposition 66
Proposition 66 would limit the three strikes law to violent and serious felonies, allow limited re-sentencing under new definitions, and increase punishment for child sex offenders. Proposition 66 failed with 47.3% approval.

Proposition 67
Proposition 67 would amend the constitution to increase the telephone surcharge be increased and to allocate funds for emergency services. Proposition 67 failed with 28.4% approval.

Proposition 68
Proposition 68 would amend the constitution to allow tribal compact amendments, allowing casino gaming for sixteen non-tribal establishments unless tribes accept. Proposition 68 failed with 16.2% approval.

Proposition 69
Proposition 69 would require and provide funding for the collection of DNA samples from all felons with submission to the state DNA database. Proposition 69 passed with 62.0% approval.

Proposition 70
Proposition 70 would require the Governor to execute a 99-year gaming compact upon tribe's request, and the tribe would contribute a percentage of its net gaming income to state funds in exchange for expanded, exclusive gaming. Proposition 70 failed with 23.7% approval.

Proposition 71

Proposition 71 would establish the California Institute for Regenerative Medicine to regulate and fund stem-cell research, would establish a constitutional right to conduct stem-cell research, and would create a stem-cell research oversight committee. Proposition 71 passed with 59.1% approval.

Proposition 72
Proposition 72 would require health care coverage for employees working for large and medium employers. Proposition 72 failed with 49.1% approval.

References

External links
"A directory of California state propositions"
Official election results form the California Secretary of State
California Legislative District Maps (1911-Present)
RAND California Election Returns: District Definitions

See also
California State Legislature
California State Assembly
California State Senate
Districts in California
Political party strength in U.S. states
Political party strength in California
Elections in California

 
California